Jimmy Chimezie Mbah (born 10 November 1992), is a Nigerian footballer who last played for Israeli club Hapoel Nazareth Illit as a defender.

Career

Club
Mbah began his career with Warri Wolves, progressing from their youth team to the senior team at 18.
In January 2013, Mbah moved to Hakoah Amidar Ramat Gan of the Israeli Liga Leumit, before six-months later moving to Waasland-Beveren in Belgium on a two-year contract.
In January 2014, Mbah returned to Israel, signing with Hapoel Bnei Lod, before joining Hapoel Petah Tikva in September of the same year on a six-month contract. In January 2015 Hapoel Petah Tikva exercised their option to extend Mbah's contract till the end of the 2014–15 season. In July 2015, Mbah signed a one-year contract with newly promoted Azerbaijan Premier League side Zira FK. On 23 May 2016, Zira announced that Mbah had left the club after one-season with them.

International
Mbah participated in the 2011 FIFA U-20 World Cup for Nigeria.

Career statistics

Club

References

External links

 
 

1992 births
Living people
Association football defenders
Nigerian footballers
Nigeria under-20 international footballers
Nigerian expatriate footballers
Liga Leumit players
Israeli Premier League players
Belgian Pro League players
Azerbaijan Premier League players
Hakoah Maccabi Amidar Ramat Gan F.C. players
S.K. Beveren players
Hapoel Bnei Lod F.C. players
Hapoel Petah Tikva F.C. players
Zira FK players
Hapoel Nof HaGalil F.C. players
Expatriate footballers in Israel
Nigerian expatriate sportspeople in Israel
Expatriate footballers in Belgium
Nigerian expatriate sportspeople in Belgium
Expatriate footballers in Azerbaijan
Nigerian expatriate sportspeople in Azerbaijan